Abu Muhammad Abdallah ibn Ahmad ibn Salim (or ibn Sulaym) al-Aswani was a tenth-century Egyptian diplomat and Shia Muslim dāʿī (missionary) in the service of the Fatimids. Following the Fatimid conquest of Egypt, he was dispatched to Nubia by the Fatimid governor Jawhar al-Siqilli in 975 AD (365 AH) or perhaps a little earlier. He left a written record of his mission, the Kitāb Akhbār al-Nūba waʾl-Muḳurra wa ʿAlwa waʾl-Buja waʾl-Nīl ("Book of Reports on Nubia, Makuria, Alodia, the Beja and the Nile"). This is the only surviving eyewitness description of medieval Nubia other than the very brief account in Ibn Ḥawqal.

Jawhar, who had led the Fatimid conquest of Egypt, was apparently under the impression that the Nubians, who had previously resisted Islamization, might be persuaded to convert to Isma'ilism, the Islamic doctrine espoused by the Fatimids. He chose as his ambassador Abdallah ibn Ahmad ibn Salim from Aswan (the nisbah al-Aswani means "of Aswan") presumably because Aswan lay on Egypt's frontier with Nubia and so Abdallah could be presumed to have some familiarity with the country.

Ibn Salim travelled through much of Lower Nubia with a large retinue. He celebrated Eid al-Adha with some sixty fellow Muslims. He stayed several months in Dongola, the capital of Makuria. There he persuaded King George II to resume payment of the baḳt, an annual tribute the Nubians had rendered to the Muslim rulers of Egypt since the seventh century. He failed, however, to persuade the king to convert to Islam, although he did engage in a debate at court. He also visited the southern kingdom of Alodia and describes its capital, Soba, in the Kitāb Akhbār al-Nūba. He does not appear to have visited the country of the Beja, however, and his descriptions of it are secondhand.

The record of Ibn Salim's voyage survives only as excerpts in al-Maqrizi and al-Manufi. The excerpts of al-Maqrizi are quoted and abridged in Ibn Iyas. The original complete work is lost. The Kitāb seems to have once circulated relatively widely, since it can be detected as a source in several works, such as that of Abu al-Makarim. The Kitāb is still one of the most important sources on medieval Nubia. He describes the geography, history and contemporary political situation of the bilād al-Sūdān. He describes a quite centralized and prosperous Makurian state. Unlike many other Arab writers, he seems favourably disposed to the Christian kingdoms.

Notes

Sources

Year of birth missing
Year of death missing
10th-century people from the Fatimid Caliphate
Ismaili da'is
Egyptian explorers
Egyptian writers
Explorers of Africa
History of Nubia
People from Aswan
10th-century Ismailis